The Allah River flows through the Allah Valley on the island of Mindanao in the Philippines. It is located in the provinces of South Cotabato, Sultan Kudarat and Maguindanao.

Its sources are Surallah, Lake Holon, and Lake Sebu. Its tributaries include the Kapingkong River and the Ga-o River. It empties into the Mindanao River.

It is partially controlled by the Allah River Irrigation Project, which includes several dams.

References

Rivers of the Philippines
Landforms of South Cotabato
Landforms of Sultan Kudarat